Maggie Riley was an English actress, best known for her roles as Maureen in Hazell and Mrs. McMahon in children's television series Grange Hill.

A member of Olivier's National Theatre company, she made frequent appearances on British TV from the 1960s.

She died on 10 October 2015 at the age of 79 after a long illness.

Credits

Television

Film

References

External links
 

2015 deaths
English stage actresses
English television actresses
Year of birth missing